Quzlu or Qowzlu may refer to various places in Iran:

Qowzlu, Alborz
Quzlu, Germi, Ardabil Province
Quzlu, Anguti, Germi County, Ardabil Province
Quzlu, Kowsar, Ardabil Province
Quzlu, Bostanabad, East Azerbaijan Province
Quzlu, Malekan, East Azerbaijan Province
Quzlu-ye Bala, Kurdistan Province
Quzlu, Qazvin
Quzlu-ye Khaneqah, West Azerbaijan Province
Qowzlu-ye Afshar, West Azerbaijan Province
Qowzlu-ye Olya, West Azerbaijan Province
Qowzlu-ye Sofla, West Azerbaijan Province
Quzlu, Zanjan
Quzlu, Mahneshan, Zanjan Province

See also
Qozlu (disambiguation), various places in Iran and Azerbaijan